Mark Holland is an American musician from Missouri. He has a classical and jazz training and labels his music global chamber music. Holland primarily plays the Native American flute.

Background 
Holland first heard the Native American flute at a concert Webster University in 1994. His career began in the mid-1990s, and he has recorded 10 CDs. He tours widely and has performed with R. Carlos Nakai, Mary Youngblood, and Bill Miller. Holland started his group, Autumn's Child, in 1995.

References

External links
Mark Holland official site

Year of birth missing (living people)
Living people
Native American flute players
Musicians from Missouri

American flautists